Jamie Dutcher (born  1962), is an American naturalist, author and sound recorder/sound mixer. Jamie and her husband, Jim Dutcher, have collaborated on seven books and two films about wolves.

Early life

Jamie Dutcher was born in Washington, D.C. and raised in Bethesda and Chevy Chase, Maryland. After attending Walt Whitman High School she graduated from the University of Maryland. She began her career as an animal keeper and veterinary technician at the Smithsonian's National Zoo in Washington, D.C. While working at the animal hospital of the National Zoo she began a correspondence with Jim Dutcher, and was invited to join his study of wolves in the Sawtooth Mountains in Idaho.

Wolves

Jamie contributed her knowledge of animal husbandry and medical care to the Dutcher film projects, and recorded the vocalizations of the Sawtooth Pack, winning a Primetime Emmy award for  the Discovery Channel wildlife documentary Wolves at Our Door (1997).

In 2005, the Dutcher's produced a follow–up documentary entitled, Living with Wolves, which chronicles their experiences living with the Idaho wolf pack, and founded Living with Wolves, a non-profit educational organization.

Awards

Jamie Dutcher received the 1998 Outstanding Sound Mixing for Nonfiction Programming Emmy award for her work on Wolves at Our Door.

Bibliography

 Dutcher, J., Dutcher, J., & Manfull, J. (2002). Wolves at Our Door: The Extraordinary Story of the Couple Who Lived with Wolves. New York: Pocket Books. 
 Dutcher, J., & Dutcher, J. (2004). Living with Wolves. Seattle, WA: Mountaineers Books. 
 Dutcher, J., Dutcher, J., Manfull, J., & Redford, R. (2013). The Hidden Life of Wolves. Washington: National Geographic. 
 Dutcher, J., & Dutcher, J. (2015). A Friend for Lakota: The Incredible True Story of a Wolf Who Braved Bullying. Washington, D.C: National Geographic Kids. 
 Dutcher, J., & Dutcher, J. (2016). Living with Wolves. Washington, D.C.: National Geographic Kids. 
 Dutcher, J., & Dutcher, J., with Manfull, J. (2018). The Wisdom of Wolves: Lessons from the Sawtooth Pack. Washington, D.C.: National Geographic Books. 
 Dutcher, J., & Dutcher, J. (2019). Running with Wolves. Washington, D.C.: National Geographic Books.

References

External links
Living with Wolves Home Page

Year of birth missing (living people)
Living people
American documentary filmmakers
Primetime Emmy Award winners
Writers from Washington, D.C.
University of Maryland, College Park alumni
21st-century American women writers
American women non-fiction writers
21st-century American non-fiction writers
American women documentary filmmakers